The Dude Perfect Show is an American reality and comedy television program that premiered on CMT on April 14, 2016, and moved to Nickelodeon on July 16, 2017. The program stars Dude Perfect members Coby Cotton, Cory Cotton, Garrett Hilbert, Cody Jones, and Tyler Toney.

Cast 
 Coby Cotton
 Cory Cotton
 Garrett Hilbert
 Cody Jones
 Tyler Toney

Production 
On September 3, 2015, CMT announced that then working title The Dude Perfect Show was green-lit to series. On March 3, 2016, CMT announced that the program would premiere on April 14, 2016. On February 1, 2017, Nickelodeon announced that it had picked up the program for a 20-episode second season. On June 21, 2017, Nickelodeon announced that the program would premiere on July 22, 2017. The second season premiered on Nickelodeon on July 16, 2017, following the premiere of 2017 Kids' Choice Sports. On July 27, 2018, the program was renewed for a third season of 15 episodes.

Episodes

Series overview

Season 1 (2016)

Season 2 (2017–18)

Season 3 (2018–19)

Ratings 
 

| link2             = #Season 2 (2017–18)
| network2          = Nickelodeon
| network_length2   = 2
| episodes2         = 20
| start2            = 
| end2              = 
| startrating2      = 1.42
| endrating2        = 0.65
| viewers2          = |2}} 
                      
| link3             = #Season 3 (2018–19)
| episodes3         = 15
| start3            = 
| end3              = 
| startrating3      = 0.57
| endrating3        = 0.72
| viewers3          = |2}} 
}}

Notes

References

External links 
 Official CMT website
 Official Nickelodeon website
 

2016 American television series debuts
2019 American television series endings
2010s American comedy television series
CMT (American TV channel) original programming
2010s Nickelodeon original programming
American comedy television series
2010s American reality television series
English-language television shows